The tricoloured munia (Lonchura malacca) is an estrildid finch, native to Bangladesh, India, Sri Lanka, Pakistan, and southern China. The species has also introduced to the Caribbean, in Trinidad, Jamaica, Hispaniola, Puerto Rico, Cuba, and Venezuela. This species, like the chestnut munia has been known as the black-headed munia.  Immature birds have pale brown upperparts, lack the dark head found in adults, and have uniform buff underparts that can be confused with immatures of other munias such as the scaly-breasted munia.

Taxonomy
The tricolored munia was formally described by the Swedish naturalist Carl Linnaeus in 1766 in the twelfth edition of his Systema Naturae under the binomial name Loxia malacca. Linnaeus mistakenly specified the locality as China, Java and Malacca. This was corrected by E. C. Stuart Baker in 1926 as Belgaum in the state of Karnataka in southwest India. The specific epithet malacca is a geographical misnomer; the species does not occur on the Malay Peninsula. The tricolored munia is now placed in the genus Lonchura that was introduced by the English naturalist William Henry Sykes in 1832. This species was formerly treated as conspecific with the chestnut munia (Lonchura atricapilla). It is monotypic: no subspecies are recognised.

Habitat
The tricoloured munia is a small gregarious bird which feeds mainly on grain and other seeds. It inhabits wet grassland habitats. It may also be found in tropical lowland moist forest habitats.

Gallery

References

External links
 Tri-coloured Munia Species Profile

tricoloured munia
Birds of India
Birds of Sri Lanka
Birds of the Dominican Republic
tricoloured munia
tricoloured munia